Caribbean Guitar is the eighteenth studio album recorded by American guitarist Chet Atkins, released in 1962.

Atkins' treatment of "Banana Boat Song" is based on The Tarriers' version, not Harry Belafonte's more famous rendition.

Reception

Writing for Allmusic, critic Richard S. Ginell wrote of the album "Chet Atkins's versatility and curiosity have covered a lot of ground, and you would think that his talent would be able to encompass calypso and other Caribbean styles as well. Alas, he isn't given much of a chance here."

Reissues
 In 1995, Travelin' and Caribbean Guitar were reissued on CD by One Way Records.

Track listing

Side one
 "Mayan Dance" (Antonio Lauro) – 2:08
 "Yellow Bird" (Marilyn Bergman, Michael Keith, Norman Luboff) – 2:00
 "Wild Orchids" (Boudleaux Bryant) – 2:34
 "Bandit" (Alfredo Ricardo do Nascimento, John Turner, Michael Carr) – 2:06
 "Jungle Dream" (Natalicio Moreyra Lima) – 2:36
 "The Banana Boat Song (Day-O)" (Erik Darling, Bob Carey, Alan Arkin) – 2:24

Side two
 "Montego Bay" (Marvin Moore, Bernie Wayne) – 2:20
 "Theme from Come September" (Bobby Darin) – 2:22
 "Moon over Miami" ( Joe Burke, Edgar Leslie) – 2:45
 "Come to the Mardi Gras" (Max Bulhoes, Milton de Oliveira) – 2:27
 "The Enchanted Sea" (Frank Metis, Randy Starr) – 2:19
 "Temptation" (Nacio Herb Brown, Arthur Freed) – 3:04

Personnel
Chet Atkins – guitar 
Karl Garvin – trumpet 
Bill Porter – engineer

References

1962 albums
Chet Atkins albums
Albums produced by Chet Atkins
RCA Victor albums
One Way Records albums